George Tarantini was an Argentine retired men's soccer head coach at North Carolina State University. He served as head coach from 1986 to 2010 and posted a 221–190–41 record.

Tarantini earned Atlantic Coast Conference Coach of the Year honors in both 1992 and 1994. He also was the NCAA regional coach of the year in 1994. He has directed North Carolina State to eight NCAA Tournament bids. Tarantini has won more games with North Carolina State than any other coach in school history.

Tarantini's 1990 North Carolina State team won the ACC championship, and reached the Final Four, before losing to UCLA on penalty kicks. North Carolina State ended the 1990 season with a 17–4–2 record, the best in school history.

Tarantini started his coaching career in 1976 at Arlington High School in LaGrange, New York. From 1977 to 1980, he served as an assistant coach at Dutchess Community College in New York.  Tarantini was an assistant coach at North Carolina State from 1982 to 1985. He now serves as the Assistant Coach for St. David's School in Raleigh.

His brother Alberto Tarantini is a former professional footballer.

References

External links
http://www.gopack.com/ViewArticle.dbml?DB_OEM_ID=9200&ATCLID=522046

NC State Wolfpack men's soccer coaches
Date of birth missing
Place of birth missing
Argentine football managers
1949 births
2019 deaths